Buchanan Lake is a lake in Otter Tail County, in the U.S. state of Minnesota.

Buchanan Lake was named for James Buchanan, 15th President of the United States.

See also
List of lakes in Minnesota

References

Lakes of Otter Tail County, Minnesota
Lakes of Minnesota